Ali Kiba set a new record at the Tanzania Music Awards by winning 17 Awards after winning 5 awards at the 2022 Tanzania Music Awards that were held for the first time in April 2, 2022 after 6 years hiatus.

Awards

Tanzania Music Awards 
 
|-
|rowspan =2|2012
|Dushelele
|Best Zouk /Rhumba Song
|
|-
|Nai Nai with Ommy Dimpoz
|Best Collaboration
|
|-
|2014
|Kidela with Abdu Kiba
|Best Collaboration
|
|-
|rowspan=7|2015 
|rowspan=3|Himself
|Best Male Artist
|
|-
|Best Male Performer
|
|-
|Song Writer of the year
|
|-
|rowspan=3|Mwana
|Song of the Year
|
|-
|Video of the year
|
|-
|Afro Pop Song of the year
|
|-
|Kiboko Yangu With Mwana FA 
|Best Collaboration
|
|-
|}

Watsup Music Awards 

|-
|rowspan=2|2016
|rowspan=2|Aje
|Best African Rnb Video
|
|-
|Best East African Video
|
|-
|}

BEFFTA Awards 

|-
|rowspan=2|2016
|rowspan=2|Aje
|Best African Act
|
|-
|Video of the Year
|
|-
|}

MTV Europe Music Awards 

|-
|2016
|Himself
|Best International Act: Africa 
|
|-
|}

Nafca 

|-
|rowspan=2|2016
|Himself
|Favorite Artist 
|
|-
|Mwana
|Favorite Song 
|
|-
|}

East Africa TV Awards 

|-
|rowspan=3|2016
|rowspan=3|Aje
|Best Male Artist
|
|-
|Song of the Year
|
|-
|Video of the Year
|
|-
|}

ASFA Awards (Uganda) 

|-
|rowspan=2|2016
|Aje
|Most Stylish Artiste East Africa
|
|-
|Aje
|Most Fashionable Music Video Africa
|
|-
|}

Soundcity Awards 

|-
|2016
|Aje
|Video of the Year
|
|-
|}

TZ INSTA Awards 2016 

|-
|2016
|Aje
|Top Trending Song
|
|-
|}

Best Celebrity Player Awards (Uganda) 

|-
|2016
|Himself
|Best Celebrity Player
|
|-
|}

WANNAMusic Awards 2016 (France) 

|-
|rowspan=3|2016
|rowspan=3|Aje
|Best Male Artist
| 
|-

|-
|Best Collabo
| 

|-
|People Choice
|
|-
|}

AFRIMA

References 

Lists of awards received by Tanzanian musicians